Ludwig van Beethoven composed the following violin sonatas between 1790 and 1812.

 Violin Sonata in A major (Beethoven), Hess 46 (fragmentary)
Violin Sonata No. 1 in D, Op. 12, No. 1
Violin Sonata No. 2 in A, Op. 12, No. 2
Violin Sonata No. 3 in E-flat, Op. 12, No. 3
Violin Sonata No. 4 in A minor, Op. 23
Violin Sonata No. 5 in F, Op. 24 ("Spring")
Violin Sonata No. 6 in A, Op. 30, No. 1
Violin Sonata No. 7 in C minor, Op. 30, No. 2
Violin Sonata No. 8 in G, Op. 30, No. 3
Violin Sonata No. 9 in A, Op. 47 ("Kreutzer")
Violin Sonata No. 10 in G, Op. 96